The Kazakhstan national under-19 football team is the national under-19 football team of Kazakhstan and is controlled by the Football Federation of Kazakhstan. The team competes in the UEFA European Under-19 Football Championship, held every year. Previously, the team participated in the AFC U-19 Championship.

Current squad
 The following players were called up for the 2023 UEFA European Under-19 Championship qualification matches.
 Match dates: 16, 19 and 22 November 2022
 Opposition: ,  and Caps and goals correct as of:''' 26 September 2022, after the match against .

FIFA U-20 World Cup

AFC U-19 Championship

U19 European Championship record

References

See also 
 Kazakhstan national football team
 Kazakhstan national under-21 football team
 Kazakhstan national under-17 football team

Under-19
European national under-19 association football teams
Asian national under-19 association football teams